Betty Lai Siu-man (born 23 June 1953), also known by her stage name Ban Ban and previously as  Bun Bun, is a retired Hong Kong actress and singer.

Background
Lai was born in Hong Kong in 23 June 1953. she is of Meixian and Guangdong ancestry. Her elder sister is Sylvia Lai Sui-pun.

In 1966, Lai, her elder sister, and the other four male singers formed a musical band named BumbleBee to promote their traffic and road safety song in Hong Kong.

In 1967, She took the stage name previously as Bun Bun, but soon changed to Ban Ban, while her sister took the stage name of Sum Sum.

In 1972, Ban Ban and Sum Sum formed a musical duo called Sum Sum Ban Ban, and both hosted in the variety show Enjoy Yourself Tonight in 1973. In 1979, they released their first studio album Star, Moon, Sun.

In 1983, Ban Ban gained her first acting role in the TVB wuxia drama The Legend of the Condor Heroes, gaining her some fame to receive future acting and hosting roles. She and Sum Sum left TVB to join ATV to further pursuit their acting and singing careers.

In 1985, she was invited by CCTV to host its New Year's Gala.

Ban Ban was married to actor Austin Wai in 1996, and they have a son, Wai Kin-ho.

She starred her last role in Forever Love Song before leaving the entertainment industry in 2000. Lai and Wai divorced in the following year and her son left with her. She allowed her son to be filial to his father.

In October 2012, Lai was notified of her ex-husband Wai's death; she signed in grief and said life is unpredictable.

She later starred in her minor role as Madam Shen in the 2015 Chinese television drama Fu Rong Jin.

References

External links
 

1953 births
Living people
Hong Kong people of Hakka descent
People from Meixian District
Hong Kong film actresses
Hong Kong television actresses
20th-century Hong Kong actresses
20th-century Hong Kong women singers
Cantopop singers
Hong Kong Mandopop singers